The 1947 Christchurch mayoral election was part of the New Zealand local elections held that same year. In 1947, election were held for the Mayor of Christchurch plus other local government positions. The polling was conducted using the standard first-past-the-post electoral method.

Incumbent Mayor Ernest Andrews was re-elected, defeating former Labour MP David Barnes and deputy mayor Melville Lyons. Fourteen Citizens' candidates were elected to the Christchurch City Council as well as five from the Labour Party.

Mayoral results
The following table gives the election results:

Council results

References

Mayoral elections in Christchurch
1947 elections in New Zealand
Politics of Christchurch
November 1947 events in New Zealand
1940s in Christchurch